Solar rotation varies with latitude.  The Sun is not a solid body, but is composed of a gaseous plasma. Different latitudes rotate at different periods. The source of this differential rotation is an area of current research in solar astronomy. The rate of surface rotation is observed to be the fastest at the equator (latitude ) and to decrease as latitude increases. The solar rotation period is 24.47 days at the equator and almost 38 days at the poles. The average rotation is 28 days.

Surface rotation as an equation
The differential rotation rate is usually described by the equation:

where  is the angular velocity in degrees per day,  is the solar latitude, A is angular velocity at the equator, and B, C are constants controlling the decrease in velocity with increasing latitude. The values of A, B, and C differ depending on the techniques used to make the measurement, as well as the time period studied. A current set of accepted average values is:
A= 14.713 ± 0.0491 °/day
B= −2.396 ± 0.188 °/day
C= −1.787 ± 0.253 °/day

Sidereal rotation
At the equator, the solar rotation period is 24.47 days. This is called the sidereal rotation period, and should not be confused with the synodic rotation period of 26.24 days, which is the time for a fixed feature on the Sun to rotate to the same apparent position as viewed from Earth. The synodic period is longer because the Sun must rotate for a sidereal period plus an extra amount due to the orbital motion of Earth around the Sun. Note that astrophysical literature does not typically use the equatorial rotation period, but instead often uses the definition of a Carrington rotation: a synodic rotation period of 27.2753 days or a sidereal period of 25.38 days. This chosen period roughly corresponds to the prograde rotation at a latitude of 26° north or south, which is consistent with the typical latitude of sunspots and corresponding periodic solar activity. When the Sun is viewed from the "north" (above Earth's north pole), solar rotation is counterclockwise (eastward). To a person standing on the North Pole, sunspots would appear to move from left to right across the Sun's face.

The Sun's rotation is counterclockwise as viewed looking down from an imaginary point above the Sun's North Pole.  When viewed from an imaginary point above the Earth's North Pole, sunspots are seen to move from left to right across the Sun's face.  In Stonyhurst heliographic coordinates, the left side of the Sun's face is called East, and the right side of the Sun's face is call West.  Therefore, sunspots are said to move across the Sun's face from east to west.

Bartels' Rotation Number
Bartels' Rotation Number is a serial count that numbers the apparent rotations of the Sun as viewed from Earth, and is used to track certain recurring or shifting patterns of solar activity. For this purpose, each rotation has a length of exactly 27 days, close to the synodic Carrington rotation rate. Julius Bartels arbitrarily assigned rotation one day one to 8 February 1832. The serial number serves as a kind of calendar to mark the recurrence periods of solar and geophysical parameters.

Carrington rotation

The Carrington rotation is a system for comparing locations on the Sun over a period of time, allowing the following of sunspot groups or reappearance of eruptions at a later time.

Because solar rotation is variable with latitude, depth and time, any such system is necessarily arbitrary and only makes comparison meaningful over moderate periods of time. Solar rotation is taken to be 27.2753 days (see below) for the purpose of Carrington rotations. Each rotation of the Sun under this scheme is given a unique number called the Carrington Rotation Number, starting from November 9, 1853. (The Bartels Rotation Number is a similar numbering scheme that uses a period of exactly 27 days and starts from February 8, 1832.)

The heliographic longitude of a solar feature conventionally refers to its angular distance relative to the central meridian crossed by the Sun-Earth radial line.
The "Carrington longitude" of the same feature refers to an arbitrary fixed reference point of an imagined rigid rotation, as defined originally by Richard Christopher Carrington.

Carrington determined the solar rotation rate from low latitude sunspots in the 1850s and arrived at 25.38 days for the sidereal rotation period. Sidereal rotation is measured relative to the stars, but because the Earth is orbiting the Sun, we see this period as 27.2753 days.

It is possible to construct a diagram with the longitude of sunspots horizontally and time vertically. The longitude is measured by the time of crossing the central meridian and based on the Carrington rotations. In each rotation, plotted under the preceding ones, most sunspots or other phenomena will reappear directly below the same phenomenon on the previous rotation. There may be slight drifts left or right over longer periods of time.

The Bartels "musical diagram" or the Condegram spiral plot are other techniques for expressing the approximate 27-day periodicity of various phenomena originating at the solar surface.

Start of Carrington Rotation 

Start dates of a new synodical solar rotation number according Carrington. Please expand this list.

Using sunspots to measure rotation
The rotation constants have been measured by measuring the motion of various features ("tracers") on the solar surface. The first and most widely used tracers are sunspots. Though sunspots had been observed since ancient times, it was only when the telescope came into use that they were observed to turn with the Sun, and thus the period of the solar rotation could be defined. The English scholar Thomas Harriot was probably the first to observe sunspots telescopically as evidenced by a drawing in his notebook dated December 8, 1610, and the first published observations (June 1611) entitled “De Maculis in Sole Observatis, et Apparente earum cum Sole Conversione Narratio” ("Narration on Spots Observed on the Sun and their Apparent Rotation with the Sun") were by Johannes Fabricius who had been systematically observing the spots for a few months and had noted also their movement across the solar disc. This can be considered the first observational evidence of the solar rotation. Christoph Scheiner (“Rosa Ursine sive solis”, book 4, part 2, 1630) was the first to measure the equatorial rotation rate of the Sun and noticed that the rotation at higher latitudes is slower, so he can be considered the discoverer of solar differential rotation.

Each measurement gives a slightly different answer, yielding the above standard deviations (shown as +/−). St. John (1918) was perhaps the first to summarise the published solar rotation rates, and concluded that the differences in series measured in different years can hardly be attributed to personal observation or to local disturbances on the Sun, and are probably due to time variations in the rate of rotation, and Hubrecht (1915) was the first one to find that the two solar hemispheres rotate differently. A study of magnetograph data showed a synodic period in agreement with other studies of 26.24 days at the equator and almost 38 days at the poles.

Internal solar rotation

Until the advent of helioseismology, the study of wave oscillations in the Sun, very little was known about the internal rotation of the Sun. The differential profile of the surface was thought to extend into the solar interior as rotating cylinders of constant angular momentum. Through helioseismology this is now known not to be the case and the rotation profile of the Sun has been found. On the surface, the Sun rotates slowly at the poles and quickly at the equator. This profile extends on roughly radial lines through the solar convection zone to the interior. At the tachocline the rotation abruptly changes to solid-body rotation in the solar radiation zone.

See also
Differential rotation in stars
Magnetohydrodynamics
Orbital period
Tachocline

References
 
Cox, Arthur N., Ed. "Allen's Astrophysical Quantities", 4th Ed, Springer, 1999.
Javaraiah, J., 2003. Long-Term Variations in the Solar Differential Rotation. Solar Phys., 212 (1): 23–49.
St. John, C., 1918. The present condition of the problem of solar rotation, Publications of the Astronomical Society of the Pacific, V.30, No. 178, 319–325.

External links
Carrington Rotation Commencement Dates 1853–2016
Carrington Rotation Start and Stop Times
Carrington Rotation Number

Sun
Articles containing video clips